Comitas miyazakiensis is a species of sea snail, a marine gastropod mollusc in the family Pseudomelatomidae, the turrids and allies.

Holotype in Kyushu University Research Museum.

Distribution
This marine species occurs off Japan

References

 Shuto, Tsugio. "Conacean gastropods from the Miyazaki group." Memoirs of the Faculty of Science, Kyushu University Ser. D Geology 11.2 (1961).

miyazakiensis
Gastropods described in 1961